Toma Tanabe (born 27 October 2002), better known as Toma (斗麗), is a Japanese kickboxer, currently competing in the featherweight division of K-1. He is a one-time Krush Featherweight title challenger.

As of July 2021, he was the #7 ranked Super Flyweight in the world by Combat Press.

Kickboxing career
Tanabe made his professional debut against Rikiya Yamaura at Krush 96 on December 16, 2018. He won the fight by unanimous decision, with all three judges awarding him a 28-25 scorecard.

Tababe made his second appearance with the promotion against Genki Adachi at Krush 99 on March 30, 2019. He won the fight by a third-round knockout, landing a left hook at the very last second of the bout.

Tanabe was scheduled to fight the future Krush Featherweight champion Takahito Niimi at K-1 World GP 2019: Japan vs World 5 vs 5 & Special Superfight in Osaka on August 24, 2019. He won the fight by unanimous decision, with all three judges scoring the bout as 30-28.

Tanabe was scheduled to face Tetsuji Noda at K-1 World GP 2019 Yokohamatsuri on November 24, 2019. Tanabe proved to be the better fighter throughout the first two rounds, and scored the only knockdown of the fight in the second round, landing a well placed knee to the jaw of TETSU. Although Tanabe was deducted a point in the third round for excessive clinching, he nonetheless did enough to be awarded a unanimous decision, with scores of 29-26, 29-26 and 29-26.

Tanabe was scheduled to fight Namito Izawa at Krush 112 on March 28, 2020. He won the fight by a first-round technical knockout, scoring three knockdowns inside of the round. The first knockdown came from a short jab, which caught Izawa posted on his right leg, with his left being raised to check a kick. The second knockdown was a result of a left straight. Izawa was knocked down for the third and final time with a left hook.

Tanabe was scheduled to face Kodai Inatsu at Krush 120 on December 19, 2020. He won the fight by a first-round technical knockout, due to the three knockdown rule. The first and third knockdowns came from a knee strike, while the second knockdown was a result of a left straight.

Tanabe initially scheduled to face Riku Morisaka, in the quarterfinals of the Krush Featherweight tournament, at Krush 117 on September 26, 2020. He was later replaced by Rikiya Yamaura, as his Kienböck's disease flared up and rendered him unable to compete.

Tanabe challenged Takahito Niimi for the Krush Featherweight title at Krush 122 on February 27, 2021. Niimi was the better fighter in the rematch, winning the fight by majority decision, with scores of 30-28, 29-28 and 28-28.

Three months later, Tanabe fought Yusho Kamemoto at K-1 World GP 2021: Japan Bantamweight Tournament on May 29, 2021. He won the fight by unanimous decision, with scores of 30-28, 30-28 and 30-29.

Tanabe was scheduled to face Tatsuki Shinotsuka at K-1 World GP 2021: Yokohamatsuri on September 20, 2021. Tanabe was rescheduled to fight Yusuke at the same event, as Shinotsuka withdrew from the bout with an injury. Toma knocked Yusuke down in both the first and second rounds, before finishing him with a left straight at the 2:05 minute mark of the second round.

Tanabe was scheduled to face Riku Morisaka at K-1 World GP 2021 in Osaka on December 4, 2021. He won the fight by unanimous decision.

Tanabe faced the K-1 Featherweight champion Taito Gunji at K-1: K'Festa 5 on April 3, 2022. The initial result of the bout was a draw, an extra round was fought which Toma lost by unanimous decision.

Tanabe faced the former K-1 featherweight champion Tatsuya Tsubakihara in the quarterfinals of the 2022 K-1 Featherweight World Grand Prix at K-1 World GP 2022 in Fukuoka on August 11, 2022. He won the fight by a close majority decision, with two judges awarding him a 30–29 scorecard, while the third judge saw the fight as an even 30–30 draw. Tanabe advanced to the semifinals, where he faced Wang Junguang. He won the fight by a dominant unanimous decision, with all of the judges awarding him every single round of the bout. He came up short in the finals however, as he lost to Taito Gunji by a first-round technical knockout.

Tanabe faced the Krush featherweight champion Shuhei Kumura at K-1 World GP 2022 in Osaka on December 3, 2022. He won the fight by unanimous decision, with two scorecards of 30–25 and one scorecard of 30–26. Tanabe knocked Kumura down with a right straight-left hook combination in the first round and a right straight in the second round.

Tanabe faced Haruto Yasumoto at K-1 World GP 2023: K'Festa 6 on March 12, 2023. He lost the fight by unanimous decision, with scores of 30–29, 30–29 and 29–28.

Titles and accomplishments
Professional
K-1
 2022 K-1 Featherweight World Grand Prix Tournament Runner-up

Amateur
 2015 Green Boy Super Welterweight Champion 
 2015 TOP RUN -50kg Champion

Kickboxing record

|- style="background:#fbb;"
| 2023-03-12 ||Loss ||align=left| Haruto Yasumoto || K-1 World GP 2023: K'Festa 6 || Tokyo, Japan || Decision (Unanimous) || 3 ||3:00 
|-  style="background:#cfc"
| 2022-12-03|| Win ||align=left| Shuhei Kumura ||  K-1 World GP 2022 in Osaka || Osaka, Japan || Decision (Unanimous) ||3 ||3:00 
|-  style="background:#fbb"
| 2022-08-11|| Loss ||align=left| Taito Gunji ||  K-1 World GP 2022 in Fukuoka, Tournament Finals || Fukuoka, Japan || TKO (Three knockdowns) || 1 || 2:57
|-
! style=background:white colspan=9 |
|-  style="background:#cfc"
| 2022-08-11|| Win ||align=left| Wang Junguang ||  K-1 World GP 2022 in Fukuoka, Tournament Semifinals || Fukuoka, Japan || Decision (Unanimous) || 3 || 3:00
|-  style="background:#cfc"
| 2022-08-11|| Win ||align=left| Tatsuya Tsubakihara || K-1 World GP 2022 in Fukuoka, Tournament Quarterfinals || Fukuoka, Japan || Decision (Majority)|| 3 ||3:00
|-
|- style="background:#fbb" 
| 2022-04-03 || Loss||align=left| Taito Gunji || K-1: K'Festa 5 || Tokyo, Japan || Ext.R Decision (Unanimous) || 4 ||3:00
|-  style="text-align:center; background:#cfc"
| 2021-12-04 || Win|| align=left| Riku Morisaka || K-1 World GP 2021 in Osaka || Osaka, Japan || Decision (Unanimous) || 3|| 3:00
|-  style="text-align:center; background:#cfc;"
| 2021-09-20 || Win ||align=left| Yusuke || K-1 World GP 2021: Yokohamatsuri || Yokohama, Japan || KO (Left straight) || 2 || 2:05
|-  style="text-align:center; background:#cfc;"
| 2021-05-30||Win  || align=left| Yusho Kanemoto || K-1 World GP 2021: Japan Bantamweight Tournament || Tokyo, Japan || Decision (Unanimous) || 3 || 3:00
|-  style="text-align:center; background:#fbb;"
| 2021-02-27||  Loss || align=left| Takahito Niimi || Krush 122 || Tokyo, Japan || Decision (Majority)|| 3 || 3:00 
|-
! style=background:white colspan=9 |
|-  style="text-align:center; background:#cfc;"
| 2020-12-19|| Win ||align=left| Kodai Inatsu || Krush.120 || Tokyo, Japan|| TKO (3 Knockdowns) || 1 || 2:42
|-  style="text-align:center; background:#cfc;"
| 2020-03-28|| Win ||align=left| Namito Izawa || Krush.112 || Tokyo, Japan || TKO (3 Knockdowns) || 1 || 2:48
|-  style="text-align:center; background:#cfc;"
| 2019-11-24 || Win|| align=left| Tetsuji Noda|| K-1 World GP 2019 Yokohamatsuri|| Yokohama, Japan ||Decision (Unanimous) || 3 || 3:00
|- style="text-align:center; background:#cfc;"
| 2019-08-24|| Win ||align=left| Takahito Niimi || K-1 World GP 2019: Japan vs World 5 vs 5 & Special Superfight in Osaka || Osaka, Japan || Decision (Unanimous) || 3 || 3:00
|-  style="text-align:center; background:#CCFFCC;"
| 2019-03-30|| Win ||align=left| Genki Adachi || Krush.99 || Tokyo, Japan || KO (Knees & Punches) || 3 || 2:59
|-  style="text-align:center; background:#CCFFCC;"
| 2018-12-16|| Win ||align=left| Rikiya Yamaura || Krush.96 || Tokyo, Japan || Decision (Unanimous) || 3 || 3:00
|-
| colspan=9 | Legend:    

|-  style="background:#CCFFCC;"
| 2018-07-01|| Win || align=left| || || Netherlands ||Decision (Unanimous) ||  ||
|-  style="background:#c5d2ea;"
| 2017-04-30|| Draw|| align=left| Shuta Shima || NEXT☆LEVEL 38|| Osaka, Japan ||Decision || 2 || 2:00
|-  style="background:#CCFFCC;"
| 2017-02-15|| Win || align=left| Haruji Morishita || Amateur HIGHSPEED 2|| Osaka, Japan || KO (2 knockdowns)|| 2 || 0:56
|-  style="background:#CCFFCC;"
| 2016-06-05|| Win || align=left| Shinnosuke Hatsuda || HOOST CUP KINGS KYOTO|| Kyoto, Japan || Decision (Unanimous)|| 2 || 2:00
|-  style="background:#c5d2ea;"
| 2016-03-21|| NC || align=left| Teruku Maezono || DEEP KICK 29|| Osaka, Japan || (Doctor Stop/Head clash) || 2 || 0:39
|-
! style=background:white colspan=9 |
|-  style="background:#CCFFCC;"
| 2016-01-31|| Win || align=left| Junya Jouichi || NEXT LEVEL Kansai 27|| Sakai, Japan || Decision (Unanimous) || 2 || 2:00
|-  style="background:#CCFFCC;"
| 2016-01-31|| Win || align=left| Kazumasa Saito || NEXT LEVEL Kansai 27|| Sakai, Japan || KO || 1 ||
|-  style="background:#CCFFCC;"
| 2015-07-26|| Win || align=left| || Green Boy Fight 9, Final || Kyoto, Japan || Decision || 2  ||2:00
|-
! style=background:white colspan=9 |
|-  style="background:#CCFFCC;"
| 2015-03|| Win || align=left| Ayano Oohara|| || Japan || KO ||   ||
|-  style="background:#CCFFCC;"
| 2015-03|| Win || align=left| Shuta Momo || || Japan || KO ||  ||
|-  style="background:#CCFFCC;"
| 2014-12-07|| Win || align=left|  || Aerodynamite Kickboxing|| Kyoto, Japan || Decision (Unanimous) || 2 || 2:00
|-  style="background:#CCFFCC;"
| 2014-08-03|| Win || align=left| Ren Shibata || Green Boy Super Fight|| Kyoto, Japan || Decision (Split) || 2 || 1:30
|-  style="background:#CCFFCC;"
| 2013-11-04|| Win || align=left| Kanta Nishimura || Muay Thai WINDY Super Fight vol.15 in KYOTO|| Kyoto, Japan || KO || 1 ||
|-  style="background:#CCFFCC;"
| 2013-09-22|| Win || align=left| Ren Shibata || || Osaka, Japan || Decision || 2 ||2:00
|-
| colspan=9 | Legend:

See also
 List of male kickboxers

References

Living people
2002 births
Japanese male kickboxers
Sportspeople from Kyoto